Jiangnan Social University is school of intelligence tradecraft operated by the Ministry of State Security (MSS) of the People's Republic of China. Sometimes called Institute of Cadre Management Suzhou by Western observers, the school was intended to be an annex of the University of International Relations, but instead has become an MSS training facility. It is located adjacent to Yinshan Lake in Suzhou, Jiangsu province, an hour's drive from Shanghai.

Academics
The university is located in Suzhou, Jiangsu province, and was established in 1984 or 1986 with around 600 students and staff. 

Originally intended to be an annex of the University of International Relations in Beijing, the school instead reportedly teaches courses in intelligence tradecraft, such as firearms, martial arts, driving, communications, and surveillance skills to MSS cadres in courses lasting up to a year. More recently, Alex Joske's 2022 book describes the compound as an older, mid-career MSS training institution with "none of the grandeur" of the newer MSS facilities. 

Satellite imagery appears to show a shooting range at the southern end of the campus.

Journal 

Since 1999, the school has published the Journal of Jiangnan Social University, featuring articles primarily on the topics of national security, Chinese communist ideology, and international relations, as well as incorporating discussions on the exploitation of emerging technologies, social control, ethnic religion, and critical theory. Submissions are open to all communist party and government agency employees at all levels, students and faculty of administrative colleges, party schools, colleges and universities, and social science research institutions, as well as authors affiliated directly with Jiangnan Social University. The journal solicits outside submissions via periodic calls for papers similar to ordinary academic institutions. The journal's quarterly issues are unclassified and available to the public, albeit behind a paywall, through CNKI. All articles are in Chinese with abstracts in Chinese and English. The journal's digital object identifier (DOI) prefix is 10.16147 and its ISSN is 1673-1026.

References

External links
Jiangnan Social University at the China Defense Universities Tracker.

Universities and colleges in Suzhou
1984 establishments in China
Educational institutions established in 1984
Intelligence education
Ministry of State Security (China)